Gangadik (also Romanized as Gangadīk; also known as Gan Gadūk) is a village in Kandovan Rural District, Kandovan District, Meyaneh County, East Azerbaijan Province, Iran. At the 2006 census, its population was 53, in 17 families.

References 

Populated places in Meyaneh County